Kremlin may refer to:

 Kremlin (fortification), a major fortified central complex found in historic Russian cities

Russia
The Kremlin or the Moscow Kremlin, the seat of the Russian (formerly Soviet) government
Government of the Soviet Union
Government of Russia 
Kremlin Ballet Theatre, a professional ballet company at the Moscow Kremlin
The Kremlin, International media of Vladimir Mezentsev school of journalism
Kazan Kremlin, a fortress and UNESCO world heritage site in Kazan
Novgorod Kremlin, a fortress and UNESCO world heritage site in Novgorod
Smolensk Kremlin, a fortress in Smolensk
Tula Kremlin, a fortress in Tula

Places
Le Kremlin-Bicêtre, a suburb and metro stop in Paris, France
Kremlin, Montana, a town in Montana, United States
Kremlin, Oklahoma, a town in Oklahoma, United States
Kremlin, Virginia, a town in Westmoreland County, Virginia, United States
Kremlin, Wisconsin, an unincorporated community in Marinette County, Wisconsin, United States

Kremlin, a nightclub in Belfast, Northern Ireland, UK
Quarry House, a building in Quarry Hill, Leeds, England, UK; nicknamed "The Kremlin"

Other uses
Kremlin (board game), a 1988 board game by Avalon Hill
Kremlin Cup, a professional tennis tournament in Russia
Kremlin, a character in No. 1 Ladies Detective Agency
 "Kremlin", a song by We Stood Like Kings from the album USSR 1926 (2015), a new soundtrack for the Soviet silent movie A Sixth Part of the World.
Moscow Kremlin (Fabergé egg)

See also

 
The Cardinal of the Kremlin, 1988 novel by Tom Clancy
Kremlings, crocodilian characters in the Donkey Kong video game series.
Kremlinology